Admiral Sangad Chaloryu (4 March 1915 – 23 November 1980) was a Thai admiral and politician who served as head of the National Administrative Reform Council (NARC), a military junta that ruled Thailand from 1976 to 1980.

Education
Sangad study at Vichaibamrungraj School at Chai Nat Province and then move to Uthai Witthayakhom School in Uthai Thani Province and move to Bangkok to study in Bansomdejchaopraya School in the navy district Thon Buri District. After graduating from High School he started to study in a military academy in Royal Thai Naval Academy and military high education at National Defence College of Thailand and Naval War College.

Careers
Sangad was considered to be a right-wing hawk and close to the CIA. In the 1930s as a young Naval Midshipman, he had trained in Nazi Germany in radar operations. As Commander of  Naval flotilla in 1954, he helped French Marines and elite forces to escape from Vietnam after Hanoi was overrun by the Vietminh. He also held the important position as Submarine Squadron Commander, Assistant Chief of Staff (operation), Commander of the Royal Thai Fleet, Deputy Commander-in-Chief of the Royal Thai Navy, and Commander in Chief of the Royal Thai Navy then Supreme Commander of the Armed Forces.

Coup leader
As defense minister, Sangad led the coup of October 6, 1976. This coup ousted the elected civilian government of Seni Pramoj. Sangad became chairman of NARC, which appointed royal favorite Thanin Kraivichien as Prime Minister. The Thanin government instituted sweeping purges of leftists and communists. Sangad was a figurehead and Army Secretary Kriangsak Chomanan was NARC's the most influential figure. NARC staged a second coup in October 1977, this time without the king's consent, and replaced Thanin with Kriangsak.

Non-military activities
Member of the House of Representatives
Member of the Constituent Assembly
Senator
Minister of Defense
Leader of 1976 coup
Leader of March 1977 coup attempt
President of the National Policy Council
Member of the 1973 National Legislative Assembly

Died
Sangad died with a heart attack on 23 November 1980 at Klaeng District Hospital, Rayong Province, at age 65 years.

Honour
  Knight Grand Cordon (Special Class) of The Most Exalted Order of the White Elephant
  Knight Grand Cordon (Special Class) of The Most Noble Order of the Crown of Thailand
  Knight Grand Commander (Second Class, Upper Grade) of The Most Illustrious Order of Chula Chom Klao

References 

Chaloryoo, Sangad
Chaloryoo, Sangad
Sangad Chaloryu
Sangad Chaloryu
Sangad Chaloryu
Sangad Chaloryu
Sangad Chaloryu
Sangad Chaloryu
Sangad Chaloryu
Sangad Chaloryu
Sangad Chaloryu
Sangad Chaloryu
Thai leaders who took power by coup